Đorđe Šušnjar (Serbian Cyrillic: Ђорђе Шушњар; born 18 February 1992) is a Serbian footballer who plays for Sloboda Užice.

Club career
Born in Ruma, he started his youth career in a local club called FK Ajaks from Novi Sad where he played between 2003 and 2005. In 2005, he joined the youth team of FK Vojvodina.  Šušnjar made his debut for FK Vojvodina against FK Javor, on 5 December 2009, at the age of 17. He was loaned to FK Donji Srem for the 2010–11 season. After the Pećinci based club earned promotion to the Serbian First League, Šušnjar extended his loan for the 2011–12 season. Halfway through the season, he returned from Donji Srem, and was then loaned to Montenegrin club Sutjeska Nikšić, where he spent the rest of 2011–12 season, establishing himself as one of the key players in team's successful attempt to avoid relegation.

International career
In 2008, Šušnjar has represented Serbian under-17 team during the qualifying round for the 2009 UEFA U-17 Championship. He played three matches, scoring a brace against Moldova and one goal against Sweden.

In August 2012 he accepted a call from the Montenegrin U-21 team to play in the 2012 Valeriy Lobanovsky international tournament, but did not made any appearance in the tournament.

References

External links
 Đorđe Šušnjar at uefa.com
 Đorđe Šušnjar at srbijafudbal.net
 

1992 births
Living people
People from Ruma
Serbian footballers
Association football forwards
Serbian expatriate footballers
Expatriate footballers in Montenegro
Expatriate footballers in Switzerland
Expatriate footballers in Latvia
Expatriate footballers in Belarus
Expatriate footballers in Brazil
Serbian SuperLiga players
Montenegrin First League players
FK Vojvodina players
FK Donji Srem players
FK Sutjeska Nikšić players
FK Jagodina players
FC Lugano players
FC Chiasso players
Riga FC players
FC Torpedo Minsk players
FK Mačva Šabac players
FK Sloboda Užice players